Kim Juhl Christensen (born 1 April 1984 in Mariager) is a Danish athlete. He represented Denmark in shot put at the 2012 Summer Olympics.

Competition record

References

External links
 

Danish male shot putters
Athletes (track and field) at the 2012 Summer Olympics
Olympic athletes of Denmark
1984 births
Living people
People from Mariager
Sportspeople from the North Jutland Region